Adelaide II of Büren (also Adelheid II. von Büren; † 3 November 1220) was the abbess of Gernrode Abbey (r.1207-1220).

Life 
Adelaide II was a member of the von Büren dynasty, a noble family which owned property in Büren, Wünnenberg and Wewelsburg.
Adelaide was probably elected abbess of Gernrode abbey in early 1207. She is named as abbess in a papal diploma issued in August 1207.
During her time as abbess, there was conflict about the appointment of a seneschal between two Ministeriales of the abbey: the  brothers Arnold and Frederick of Gernrode. The conflict was settled by Bishop Frederick of Halberstadt on 10 August 1220.

Adelaide died on 3 November, probably 1220.

Notes

References 
Otto von Heinemann, Geschichte der Abtei und Beschreibung der Stiftskirche zu Gernrode. (H. C. Huch, Quedlinburg 1877).
 Hans K. Schulze, Das Stift Gernrode. Unter Verwendung eines Manuskriptes von Reinhold Specht. Mit einem kunstgeschichtlichen Beitrag von Günther W. Vorbrodt. (Mitteldeutsche Forschungen Bd. 38) (Böhlau, Cologne, 1965).

External links 

13th-century German abbesses
12th-century German abbesses
1220 deaths